A. R. Raja Raja Varma or A R. Rajaraja Varma (1863–1918) was an Indian poet, grammatician and Professor of Oriental Languages at Maharaja's College (present University College), Trivandrum.

Early life 
A. R. Raja Raja Varma was part of the royal family of erstwhile Parappanad, Malappuram district. Rajaraja Varma Koyi Thampuran was born in February 1863 at the Lakshmipuram Palace in Changanacherry to mother Kunjikkavu Thampuratti and father Vasudevan Namboodiri from the Malayalam.

Work 
Varma wrote widely in Sanskrit and Malayalam. He is known as Kerala Panini for his contributions to Malayalam Literature. Varma was the moving spirit behind the great literary renaissance in Kerala in the Golden Age of Malayalam literature. Says Ulloor of A.R. Rajaraja Varma, "While others embellished the walls of the mansion of Malayalam literature with their paintings and drawings, A.R. worked both on its foundation and dome and made it a long enduring and imposing structure for the benefit of the people of Kerala. His fame rests on this architectural accomplishment and is bound to last forever".

Major works

On grammar and rhetoric
His important works are Kerala Panineeyam, Bhashabhooshanam, Vritha Manjari and Sahitya Sahyam, the last of which introduced English-style punctuation to Malayalam.

Poems
 Bhangavilaapam
 Malayavilasam

Translations

 Bhasha Megha Dootu
 Bhasha Kumara Sambhavam
 Malayala Sakuntalam
 Malavikagnimitram
 Charudattam

References

Further reading
 
 
 

19th-century Indian poets
Indian Sanskrit scholars
1863 births
1918 deaths
Scholars from Thiruvananthapuram
Translators of Kalidasa
Academic staff of the University College Thiruvananthapuram
Malayalam-language writers
Indian male poets
Poets from Kerala
19th-century Indian translators
20th-century Indian poets
20th-century Indian translators
20th-century Indian linguists
19th-century Indian linguists